Strigiphilus garylarsoni is a species of chewing louse found only on owls. The species has no common name.

The species was first described by biologist Dale H. Clayton in 1990.

Host
Its type host is the Northern white-faced owl (Ptilopsis leucotis).

Distribution
The type location is Ndola, Zambia.

Etymology
It was named after Gary Larson, creator of the syndicated cartoon The Far Side. In a letter to Larson, Clayton praised the cartoonist for "the enormous contribution that my colleagues and I feel you have made to biology through your cartoons." In his 1989 book The Prehistory of the Far Side, Larson stated, "I considered this an extreme honor. Besides, I knew no one was going to write and ask to name a new species of swan after me. You have to grab these opportunities when they come along." Clayton wrote he honored Larson "in appreciation of the unique light he has shed on the workings of nature."

See also 
 List of organisms named after famous people (born 1950–present)
 Serratoterga larsoni
 Thagomizer

References

Further reading

External links 

 

Insects described in 1990
The Far Side
Lice
Parasites of birds
Insects of Zambia